Rikuya Itō (born 10 November 1998) is a Japanese athlete. He competed in the men's 4 × 400 metres relay event at the 2020 Summer Olympics.

References

External links
 

1998 births
Living people
Japanese male sprinters
Athletes (track and field) at the 2020 Summer Olympics
Olympic athletes of Japan
People from Funabashi
Sportspeople from Chiba Prefecture
20th-century Japanese people
21st-century Japanese people